The 1994 Kansas gubernatorial election included Republican Bill Graves who won the open seat vacated by the pending retirement of Governor Joan Finney. He defeated Jim Slattery.

Republican primary

Candidates
Bill Graves, Secretary of State of Kansas

Democratic primary

Candidates
Jim Francisco, incumbent Lieutenant Governor
Jim Slattery, U.S. Representative from Kansas's 2nd congressional district
Joan Wagnon, State Representative from Topeka

Results

References 

Gubernatorial
1994
Kansas